is a passenger railway station located in the city of Imabari, Ehime Prefecture, Japan. It is operated by JR Shikoku and has the station number "Y42".

Lines
Namikata Station is served by the JR Shikoku Yosan Line and is located 152.3 km from the beginning of the line at Takamatsu Station. Connections with other local or limited express trains are needed to travel further east or west along the line.

Layout
The station, which is unstaffed, consists of two opposed side platforms serving two tracks. There is no station building, only weather shelters on the platforms. The entrance to the station is located at a road level crossing 100 metres away. From there, two long footpaths run parallel and on either side of the tracks, leading to the platforms. To cross from one platform to the other, it is necessary to walk down one footpath to the level crossing and then up the other. Parking lots, a bike shed and a toilet are also provided near the level crossing.

Adjacent stations

History
Japanese National Railways (JNR) opened Namikata Station on 1 March 1960 as a new station on the existing Yosan Line. With the privatization of JNR on 1 April 1987, control of the station passed to JR Shikoku.

Surrounding area
Imabari City Hall Namikata Branch
Imabari City Namikata Library

See also
 List of railway stations in Japan

References

External links

Station timetable

Railway stations in Ehime Prefecture
Railway stations in Japan opened in 1960
Imabari, Ehime